The genus Blarina is a group of relatively large shrews with relatively short tails found in North America. They have 32 teeth and are in the red-toothed shrew subfamily.

They generally have dark fur and thick feet. The saliva of these animals is toxic and is used to subdue prey.
Species are:
Northern short-tailed shrew B. brevicauda
Southern short-tailed shrew B. carolinensis
Elliot's short-tailed shrew B. hylophaga
Everglades short-tailed shrew B. peninsulae

Ecoepidemiology 
Short-tailed shrews are one of the animal reservoirs of the agents of Lyme disease and human babesiosis.

References

 
Mammal genera
Animals that use echolocation
Taxa named by John Edward Gray